Arnošt of Pardubice (25 March 1297 probably in Hostinka – 30 June 1364 in Roudnice nad Labem) was the first Archbishop of Prague (and the last bishop). He was also an advisor and diplomat to Emperor Charles IV.

Life
Arnošt of Pardubice was probably born in Hostinka (today part of Vestec), but possibly also in Kłodzko. He was the eldest son of Knight Arnošt of Hostinka, and spent his childhood in Kłodzko.

Arnošt inherited the town of Pardubice in 1340. He was confirmed bishop of Prague on 11 March 1343 (3 March 1343 O.S.), and was commissioned the first Archbishop of Prague on 8 May 1344 (30 April 1344 O.S.). He ordered the monks to contribute to the newly founded Charles University (14th century), hence enhancing the quality of the education in the institution.

Further reading

 Jaroslav Polc: Ernst vom Pardubitz. In: Ferdinand Seibt, Lebensbilder zur Geschichte der böhmischen Länder, Bd. 3, 1978
 Arnestus von Pardubitz. Grafschaft Glatzer Buchring, Band 35
 Franz Albert: Das Testament des Erzbischofs Ernst von Pardubitz In: Glatzer Heimatblätter 1928, pp. 81–86
 Dehio-Handbuch der Kunstdenkmäler in Polen Schlesien, Deutscher Kunstverlag 2005, 
 Zdeňka Hledíková: Arnošt z Pardubic, Vyšehrad 2008, pp. 13, 17–19
 Zdeňka Hledíková: Kirche und König zur Zeit der Luxemburger. In: Bohemia Sacra. Düsseldorf 1974, pp. 307–314
 Zdeňka Hledíková, Jana Zachová: Život Arnošta z Pardubic podle Valentina Krautwalda, Pardubice 1997, 
 Vilém z Hasenburka: Vita venerabilis Arnesti primi archiepiscopi ecclesie Pragensis / Život ctihodného Arnošta, prvniho arcibiskupa kostele pražskeho (in Latin and Czech), Česká křesťanská akademie, Prague 1994, 
 V Chaloupecký: Arnošt z Pardubic, první arcibiskup pražský, Prague 1946
 J. K. Vyskočil, Arnošt z Pardubic a jeho doba, Prague 1947

References

External links

Catholic Encyclopedia: The first archbishop was St. Ernst of Pardubitz, the advisor of Charles IV in his great undertakings

1297 births
1364 deaths
Christianity in Prague
Roman Catholic archbishops of Prague
14th-century Roman Catholic bishops in Bohemia
People from Náchod District